St. Paul's United Methodist Church can refer to:
 St. Paul's United Methodist Church (Nyack, New York), listed on the U.S. National Register of Historic Places
 St. Paul's United Methodist Church (Houston, Texas)
 St. Paul's United Methodist Church (South Bend, Indiana), built by the Studebaker family
 St. Paul's United Methodist Church (Toledo, Ohio), formerly listed on the National Register of historic Places in Lucas County, Ohio

See also 
 St. Paul's Methodist Church (disambiguation)